Enoch Kwame Tweneboah Donkoh (1939–2016) was a Ghanaian Ghanaian soldier, politician and diplomat. He served as the Minister of Defence from 1999 to 2001 under the Rawlings government.

Politics 
He was a member of the National Democratic Congress. He served as Deputy Minister of Defence from 1994 to 1999. In February 1999, Donkoh was appointed by President Jerry John Rawlings to replace Alhaji Mahama Iddrisu as Minister of Defence. He served in role from February 1999 to January 2001.

Diplomatic career 
In September 2009, Donkoh was appointed by president John Evans Atta Mills to serve as Ghana's ambassador to Ivory Coast.

Death 
Donkoh died on 13 July 2016 at the age of 77 years.

References 

Ghanaian soldiers
National Democratic Congress (Ghana) politicians
Defence ministers of Ghana
Ambassadors of Ghana to Ivory Coast
2016 deaths
Ghana Army personnel